Aktaş (literally "white stone") is a Turkish name that may refer to:

Surname
Ceyda Aktaş (born 1994), Turkish female volleyball player
Emre Aktaş (born 1986), Turkish footballer
Gülşen Aktaş (born 1957), Turkish schoolteacher and political scientist
Kubilay Aktaş (born 1995), Turkish footballer
Metin Aktaş (born 1977), Turkish footballer
Serap Aktaş (born 1971), Turkish female long-distance runner
Serenay Aktaş (born 1993), Tyrkish women's footballer, and television and film actress
Süleyman Aktaş, Turkish serial killer
Uğur Aktaş (karateka) (born 1995), Turkish karateka

Places
Lake Aktaş, on the Georgia–Turkey border
Aktaş Dağı, a mountain on the Iran–Turkey border

Turkey
Aktaş, Akçakoca
Aktaş, Amasya, a village in the district of Amasya, Amasya Province
Aktaş, Araç, a village
Aktaş, Buldan
Aktaş, Büyükorhan
Aktaş, Çivril
Aktaş, Çüngüş
Aktaş, Gerede, a village in the district of Gerede, Bolu Province
Aktaş, Gölpazarı, a village in the district of Gölpazarı, Bilecik Province
Aktaş, Ilgaz
Aktaş, İspir
Aktaş, Kahta, a village in the district of Kahta, Adıyaman Province
Aktaş, Karaisalı, a village in the district of Karaisalı, Adana Province
Aktaş, Kemah
Aktaş, Kumlu, a village in Kumlu district of Hatay Province
Aktaş, Şenkaya
Aktaş, Sındırgı, a village
Aktaş, Tercan
Aktaş, Ulus, a village in the district of Ulus, Bartın Province
Aktaş, Şereflikoçhisar, a village in the district of Şereflikoçhisar, Ankara Province

See also
Aktash (disambiguation), an alternate spelling

Turkish-language surnames